The ISOLDE Radioactive Ion Beam Facility, is an on-line isotope separator facility located at the heart of the CERN accelerator complex on the Franco-Swiss border. The name of the facility is an acronym for Isotope Separator On Line DEvice. Created in 1964, the ISOLDE facility started delivering radioactive ion beams to users in 1967. Originally located at the SynchroCyclotron accelerator (CERN's first ever particle accelerator), the facility has been upgraded several times most notably in 1992 when the whole facility was moved to be connected to CERN's ProtonSynchroton Booster (PSB). Entering its 6th decade of existence, ISOLDE is currently the oldest facility still in operation at CERN. From the first pioneering isotope separation on-line (ISOL) beams to the latest technical advances allowing for the production of the most exotic species, ISOLDE benefits a wide range of physics communities with applications covering nuclear, atomic, molecular and solid-state physics, but also biophysics and astrophysics, as well as high-precision experiments looking for physics beyond the Standard Model. The facility is operated by the ISOLDE Collaboration, comprising CERN and fifteen (mostly) European countries. As of 2019, more than 800 experimentalists around the world (including all continents) are coming to ISOLDE to perform typically 45 different experiments per year.

Radioactive nuclei are produced at ISOLDE by shooting a high-energy (1.4GeV) beam of protons delivered by CERN's PSBooster accelerator on a 20 cm thick target. Several target materials are used depending on the desired final isotopes that are requested by the experimentalists. The interaction of the proton beam with the target material produces radioactive species through spallation, fragmentation and fission reactions. They are subsequently extracted from the bulk of the target material through thermal diffusion processes by heating the target to about 2000 degrees.  The cocktail of produced isotopes is ultimately filtered using one of ISOLDE's two magnetic dipole mass separators to yield the desired isobar of interest. The time required for the extraction process to occur is dictated by the nature of the desired isotope and/or that of the target material and places a lower limit on the half-life of isotopes which can be produced by this method, and is typically of the order of a few milliseconds. Once extracted, the isotopes are directed either to one of several low-energy nuclear physics experiments or an isotope-harvesting area. An upgrade of the pre-existing REX post-accelerator, the latest addition to the ISOLDE facility is the HIE-ISOLDE superconducting linac which allows the re-acceleration of the radioisotopes to higher energies.

Background
The number of protons in a nucleus determine what element it belongs to: to have a neutral atom, the same number of electrons circulate around the atomic nucleus and these define the chemical properties of the element. However, a specific element can occur with different ‘nuclei’, each having the same number of protons but a different number of neutrons. These variations of the element are called its isotopes. For example, three isotopes of the element carbon are called carbon-12, carbon-13 and carbon-14; which have 6, 7, 8 neutrons respectively. The numbers added after the element name are the mass number of the isotope i.e. the sum of the number of protons and neutrons in the nucleus. 

Each isotope of an element has different stability depending on their numbers of protons and neutrons. The word nuclide is used to refer to the isotopes with respect to their stability and nuclear energy state. Stable nuclides can be found in nature but unstable (i.e. radioactive) ones cannot because they spontaneously decay into more stable nuclides. Scientists use accelerators and nuclear reactors to produce and examine radioactive nuclides. The neutron-to-proton ratio has a strong impact on the properties of the isotope in question. Most notably, as this ratio strongly departs from unity the isotopes usually become ever increasingly short-lived. The time required to lose half of a population of a given nuclide through radioactive decays, the so-called half-life, is a measure of how stable an isotope is. 

Similar to the periodic table of elements for atoms, nuclides are usually visually represented on a table (the so-called Segré chart or chart of nuclides) where the proton number is represented on the y-axis while the x-axis represents the neutron number.

History

In 1950, two Danish physicists Otto Kofoed-Hansen and Karl-Ove Nielsen discovered a new technique for producing radioisotopes which enabled producing isotopes with shorter half-lives than earlier methods. Ten years later, in Vienna, at a symposium about separating radioisotopes, plans for an ‘on-line’ isotope separator were published. Using these plans, CERN's Nuclear Chemistry Group (NCG) built a prototype on-line mass separator coupled to target and ion source, which was bombarded by a proton beam delivered by CERN's the Synchro-Cyclotron. The test was a success and showed that the Synchro-Cyclotron was an appropriate machine for on-line rare isotope production. In 1964, a proposal for an isotope separator on-line project was accepted by the CERN Director-General and the ISOLDE project began.

The "Finance Committee" for the project set up with five members, then extended to 12. As the term "Finance Committee" had other connotations, it was decided 'until a better name was found' to call the project ISOLDE and the committee the ISOLDE Committee. In May 1966, the Synchro-Cyclotron shut down for some major modifications. One of these modifications was the construction of a new tunnel to send proton beams to a future underground hall that would be dedicated to ISOLDE. In 1965, as the underground hall at CERN was being excavated, the isotope separator for ISOLDE was being constructed in Aarhus. Separator construction made good progress in 1966 and the underground hall was finished in 1967. On 16 October 1967, the first experiment carried out and successfully.

Shortly after the ISOLDE experimental program started, some major improvements for SC were planned. In 1972 the SC shut down to upgrade its beam intensity by changing its radiofrequency system. The SC improvement program increased the primary proton beam intensity by about a factor of 100. To be able to handle this high-intensity ISOLDE facility also needed some modifications. After necessary modifications, the new ISOLDE facility also known as ISOLDE 2 was launched in 1974. Its new target design combined with the increased beam intensity from the SC led to significant enhancements in the number of nuclides produced. However, after some time the external beam current from the SC started to be a limiting factor. The collaboration discussed the possibility of moving the facility to an accelerator that could reach higher current values but decided on building another separator with ultra-modern design, for the facility. The new high-resolution separator, ISOLDE 3, was in full use by the end of the 80s. In 1990 a new ion source named Resonance Ionization Laser Ion Source (RILIS) was installed at the facility to selectively and efficiently produce radioactive beams.

The Synchro-Cyclotron was decommissioned in 1990, after having been in operation for more than three decades. As a consequence, the collaboration decided to relocate the ISOLDE facility to the Proton Synchrotron, and place the targets in an external beam from its 1 GeV booster. The construction of the new ISOLDE experimental hall started about three months prior to the decommissioning of the Synchro-Cyclotron. With the relocation also came several upgrades. The most notable being the installation of two new magnetic dipole mass separators. One general-purpose separator with only one magnet and the other one is a high-resolution separator with two magnets. The latter one is a reconstructed version of the ISOLDE 3. The first experiment at the new facility, known as ISOLDE PSB, was performed on 26 June 1992. In May 1995, two industrial robots were installed in the facility to handle the targets and ion sources units without human intervention.

To diversify the scientific activities of the facility,  a post-accelerator system called REX-ISOLDE (Radioactive beam EXperiments at ISOLDE) was inaugurated at the facility in 2001. With this new addition, nuclear reaction experiments which require a high-energy radioactive ion beam could now be performed at ISOLDE.  

The facility building was extended in 2005 to allow more experiments to be set up. ISCOOL, an ion cooler and buncher,  increasing the beam quality for experiments was installed at the facility in 2007. Furthermore, HIE-ISOLDE (High Intensity and Energy Upgrade), a project for upgrading beam intensity and energy, was approved in 2009 and has been completed in several phases.   In late 2013 the construction of a new facility for medical research called CERN MEDICIS (MEDICal Isotopes Collected from ISOLDE) started. The facility is designed to work with proton beams that have already passed a first  target. Of the incident beams, only 10% are actually stopped in the targets and achieve their objective, while the remaining 90% are not used.

In 2013, during the Long Shutdown 1, three ISOLDE buildings were demolished. They've been built again as a new single building with a new control room, a data storage room, three laser laboratories, a biology and materials laboratory, and a room for visitors. Another building extension for the MEDICIS project and several others equipped with electrical, cooling and ventilation systems to be used for the HIE-ISOLDE project in the future were also built. In addition, the robots which were installed for the handling of radioactive targets have been replaced with more modern robots. In 2015, for the first time, a radioactive isotope beam could be accelerated to an energy level of 4.3 MeV per nucleon in the ISOLDE facility thanks to the HIE-ISOLDE upgrades. In late 2017, the CERN-MEDICIS facility produced its first radioisotopes.

Facility and concept

Before ISOLDE, the radioactive nuclides were transported from the production area to the laboratory for examination. In ISOLDE, from the production to the measurements all the processes are connected, or in other words, they're "on-line". Radioactive nuclides are produced by bombarding a target with protons from a particle accelerator. Then they are ionized using surface, plasma or laser ion sources before being separated according to their masses by using magnetic dipole mass separators. After producing the beam of the preferred isotope, the beam can be cooled and/or bunched to reduce the emittance and energy spreads of the beam. Then the beam is directed to either low-energy experiments or a post-accelerator to increase its energy.

At THE ISOLDE facility, the main beam for reactions comes from the Proton Synchrotron. This incoming proton beam has an energy value of 1.4 GeV and its average intensity is up to 2 μA. The facility has two separators. One of them called the general purpose separator (GPS) and which is made with an H-type magnet with a bending radius of 1.5 m and a bending angle of 70°. Its resolution is approximately 800. The other separator is called the high resolution separator (HRS) is made from two C-type dipole magnets. Their bending radii are 1m and bending angles are 90° and 60°. The overall resolution of these two magnets can reach values higher than 7000.

The class A laboratories, buildings for the HIE-ISOLDE and MEDICIS projects, and building 508 which serves as a home for THE ISOLDE control rooms as well as other operations can be seen on the sketch. The 1.4 GeV proton beam from the PS Booster, coming from the right on the sketch, is being directed to one of the separators. The general purpose separator sends beams to an electronic switchyard which allows scientists to conduct up to three simultaneous experiments. The high resolution separator with two magnets and beam-correcting elements, can be used for experiments that require higher mass resolution values. One branch from the GPS switchyard and HRS are connected to a common central beamline which is used to provide beam to various experimental setups dedicated to nuclear spectroscopy and nuclear orientation, laser spectroscopy, high-precision mass spectrometry, solid-state and surface studies.

The traditional ion source units at ISOLDE are based on surface or plasma ionization techniques. In addition to those techniques a laser based ion source called RILIS, which allows an element sensitive selection of isotopes, is also being used for some elements. To be able to deliver beams with higher quality and increased sensitivity an ion cooler and buncher called ISCOOL, is being used in the HRS separator. All in all, the ISOLDE facility provides 1300 isotopes from 75 elements in the periodic table.

The project CERN-MEDICIS, which is a part of the ISOLDE facility, is running to supply radioactive isotopes for medical applications. The experiments at ISOLDE facility use about half of the protons in the beams from PS Booster. The beams preserve 90% of their intensities after hitting a standard target in the facility. CERN-MEDICIS project uses the remaining protons on a target that is placed behind the HRS target to produce radioisotopes for medical purposes. The irradiated target is then being carried to MEDICIS building by using an automated conveyor to separate and collect the isotopes of interest.

Accelerating them to higher energy levels is a good technique to be able to examine radioactive isotopes further. For this purpose, a post-accelerator called REX-ISOLDE, which accelerates the newly produced radioisotopes up to 3 MeV, is being used at ISOLDE facility. The accelerated isotopes are being directed to the target setup of a nuclear spectroscopy experiment, which includes charged-particle detectors and the MINIBALL gamma ray detector. Originally intended to accelerate light isotopes, REX-ISOLDE project has passed this goal and provided post-accelerated beams of a wider mass range, namely from 6He up to 224Ra. REX-ISOLDE has delivered accelerated beams of more than 100 isotopes of more than 30 elements since its commissioning.

To be able to satisfy the ever-increasing needs of higher quality, intensity, and energy of the production beam is very important for facilities such as ISOLDE. As the latest response to satisfy these needs, HIE-ISOLDE upgrade project has been started. Due to its phased planning, the upgrade project will be carried out with the least impact on the experiments continuing in the facility. The project includes an energy increase for the REX-ISOLDE up to 10 MeV as well as resonator and cooler upgrades, enhancement of the input beam from PS Booster, improvements on targets, ion sources, and mass separators. As of 2018 most of the energy upgrades, including increasing REX-ISOLDE energy to 10MeV, completed and phase two is concluded. Upgrades about intensity are planned to be done in phase three. As a state-of-the-art project, HIE-ISOLDE is expected to expand the research opportunities in ISOLDE facility to the next level. When completed, the upgraded facility will be able to host advanced experiments in fields like nuclear physics, nuclear astrophysics.

Solid-state physics laboratory
Attached to ISOLDE is in building 508 one of the largest solid-state physics laboratory for perturbed angular correlation that receive its major funding from BMBF. It uses about 20-25% of ISOLDE's beam time. Its major focus is the study of functional materials, such as metals, semiconductors, insulators and bio-molecules. The main use of exotic PAC-isotopes, such as 111mCd, 199mHg, 204mPb as well as transition metal isotopes are important for materials research. Because many isotopes have half-lives that are in the range of minutes and hours, experiments need to be performed on-site. Additional methods are tracer diffusion, online-Mössbauer spectroscopy (57Mn) and photoluminescence with radioactive nuclei.

Results and discoveries
Below is the list of some physics activities done at ISOLDE facility.
 Extension of the table of nuclides by discovering new isotopes
 High precision measurements of nuclear masses
 Discovery of shape staggering in light Hg isotopes
 Production of isomeric beams
 Discovery of beta-delayed multi particle emission
 Studies on nuclear resonance systems beyond the dripline
 Proofs of existence of nuclear halo structure
 Synthesis of waiting-point nuclei
 Atomic spectroscopy of francium
 Studies on beta-neutrino correlations
 First observations of short-lived pear-shaped atomic nuclei
 Measurement of the mass and charge radii of exotic calcium nuclei
 Discovery of new magic numbers and disappearance of some well established shell closures

References

Further reading

External links 
 
 ISOLDE page within CERN website
 A mini documentary series about ISOLDE by CERN (YouTube playlist)
 A poster about ISOLDE from ISOLDE website
 A poster about HIE-ISOLDE and some other upgrades from ISOLDE website

See also 
Eurisol
Total absorption spectroscopy
Facility for Rare Isotope Beams
Rare Isotope Science Project

Particle physics facilities
CERN facilities
Mass spectrometry